III liga, group A was one of 8 groups of III liga, the 4th level of Polish football league system. The group was created in 2008/2009 season and existed until the end of 2015/16. The teams from Łódź and Masovian voivodeships took part in the competition. In season 2016/17 the group was merged with group B to form III liga, group I.

Season 2008/09 

Final table

Season 2009/10 

Final table

Season 2010/11

Season 2011/12

Season 2012/13

Season 2013/14

Season 2015/16 

Next seasons: III liga, group I.

References

 
Football leagues in Poland